CIC may refer to:

Organizations

Canada
 Cadet Instructors Cadre, a part of the Canadian Armed Forces
 Canadian Infantry Corps, renamed in 1947 to Royal Canadian Infantry Corps
 Canadian International Council
 Canadian Islamic Congress
 Chemical Institute of Canada
 Immigration, Refugees and Citizenship Canada, formerly Citizenship and Immigration Canada
 Columbia International College, Ontario
 Credit Institute of Canada, a non-profit professional association
 Crown Investments Corporation, Saskatchewan

China
 China Investment Corporation, a Chinese sovereign wealth fund
 Chinese Industrial Cooperatives

India
 Central Information Commission
 Cluster Innovation Centre
Coordination of Islamic Colleges

Kenya
 CIC Insurance Group Limited, an insurance provider
 Commission for the Implementation of the Constitution (CIC)

United Kingdom
 Children in Crossfire, a charity located in Derry.
 Community interest company, a type of social enterprise company
 Construction Industry Council
 Cult Information Centre, a cult education resource

United States
 Cable in the Classroom, a defunct American division of the National Cable & Telecommunications Association
 Cambridge Innovation Center, a real estate services company
 Cedar Rapids and Iowa City Railway, a railroad
 Census Information Center, a program is part of the U.S. Census Bureau's data dissemination network
 Center on International Cooperation, a foreign policy think tank based at New York University
 Central Intercollegiate Conference, an intercollegiate athletic conference that operated from 1928 to 1968
 Check Into Cash, a US Payday Loan/Financial Institution
 CIC Video, a defunct home video distributor 
 Cinema International Corporation, the forerunner to United International Pictures, a film distributor
 Committee on Institutional Cooperation, an academic consortium of US universities in the Big Ten Conference
 Council of Independent Colleges, an association of nonprofit independent colleges and universities
 Counter Intelligence Corps, a former intelligence agency within the United States Army
 Criminal Investigation Corps, a Puerto Rico Police Department division
 United States Army Criminal Investigation Command

Hong Kong 

 Castle Peak Bay Immigration Centre
 Construction Industry Council (Hong Kong)

Other organisations
 CIC Holdings, a listed company in Sri Lanka formerly known as Chemical Industries (Colombo) PLC
 College of the Immaculate Conception (disambiguation)
 Combined Independent Colleges, Australia
 Crédit Industriel et Commercial, a French bank
 International Council for Game and Wildlife Conservation (Conseil International de la Chasse)

Science and medicine
 Cardioinhibitory centre
 Chronic idiopathic constipation, constipation that does not have a physical or physiological cause
 CIC (gene), a gene encoding Capicua homolog, which is a human protein that may play a role in brain development
 Combined injectable contraceptive, taken to suppress fertility

Technology
 Calculus of inductive constructions, a formal system used in logic, mathematics, and computer science 
 Carrier Identification Code, a four-digit telephony identification code
 Cascaded integrator-comb, an economical class of digital filters for decimation and interpolation
 CIC (Nintendo), a security lockout chip used in Nintendo game consoles
 Circuit identification code, used in ISDN User Part
 Clustered integer core, an AMD CPU architecture

Other uses
 Cambridge International Corpus, former name of the Cambridge English Corpus, a text corpus of English language
 Catholic Integrated Community, a catholic community originating from Germany, active in Germany, Austria, Italy, Hungary, USA and Tanzania
 Certified Insurance Counselor, an insurance agent professional certification designation
 Combat information center, a military operations room
 Commander-in-chief, the person or body that exercises supreme operational command and control of a nation's military forces
 Charles in Charge, an American sitcom series that ran until 1990
 Chico Municipal Airport (IATA airport code), California, US
 Code of Canon Law (disambiguation) (Codex Iuris Canonici), the ecclesiastical law of the Latin Catholic Church
 Commercial in confidence, referring to classified information
 Community indifference curve, in economics
 Concours International Combiné, or "International Combined Contest", a category of competition in equestrianism
 Critical illness cover, an insurance product paying out a lump sum on the diagnosis of a critical illness

See also
 CICS (disambiguation)